Costasiellidae is a taxonomic family of small to minute sacoglossan sea slugs. These are marine opisthobranch gastropod mollusks belonging to the superfamily Plakobranchoidea.

These sea slugs resembling nudibranchs, but are not closely related to them.

This family has no subfamilies.

Genera
The following  genera belong to the family Costasiellidae:
 Costasiella Pruvot-Fol, 1951
 Panderevela Moro & Ortea, 2015

References